The Glenwood B&O Railroad Bridge is a truss bridge in Pittsburgh, Pennsylvania, which carries Allegheny Valley Railroad's W&P Subdivision over the Monongahela River.

The span was constructed in 1884 and upgraded in 1915. It served the busy Wheeling division of the Baltimore & Ohio Railroad, which in 1928, operated an average of 19 freight and 12 passenger trains across the structure each day. After B&O was absorbed into CSX Transportation, this company ran local freight trains across the bridge; the short line Allegheny Valley Railroad has a long-term lease to manage this structure, which serves a route between its headquarters in an adjacent rail yard and Washington, Pennsylvania.

See also
List of crossings of the Monongahela River

External links

Glenwood Bridge - B&O RR

Railroad bridges in Pennsylvania
Bridges in Pittsburgh
Bridges over the Monongahela River
Former CSX Transportation bridges
Baltimore and Ohio Railroad bridges
Bridges completed in 1884
Steel bridges in the United States